Denair Mitchell is a Bahamian international soccer player, who plays as a striker for Cavalier FC and the Bahamas national team

International career
He made his international debut for Bahamas in a June 2008 FIFA World Cup qualification match against Jamaica, his sole international match as of April 2016.

References

External links

1989 births
Living people
Sportspeople from Nassau, Bahamas
Association football forwards
Bahamian footballers
Bahamas international footballers
Cavalier FC players
BFA Senior League players